İdil Üner (born 1 August 1971 in West Berlin, West Germany) is a German-Turkish actress.

Üner studied at the Berlin University of the Arts. She received piano lessons for 17 years—starting from the age of 6—and formal opera training for two years. She joined the youth chapters of the Turkish-speaking theater Tiyatrom in Berlin of which her father was a founding member. She made her television debut in the series Tatort (1993) and her cinema debut with Rudolf Thome's . Üner achieved recognition in the works of Fatih Akın and Thomas Arslan, particularly  and In July. She wrote the lyrics to "Güneşim", the main song of Im Juli. She also wrote and directed a short film in 2001 named Die Liebenden vom Hotel von Osman in which she shares the leading roles with Fatih Akın. In 2004, in the segment directed by Fatih Akin of the film Visions of Europe, Üner sang the title lied by Schumann, "Die alten, bösen Lieder".

Selected filmography
1995: 
1998: Short Sharp Shock (Kurz und schmerzlos)
1999: 
2000: In July
2000: Zwei Mädels auf Mallorca – Die heißeste Nacht des Jahres
2001: Mostly Martha
2004: 
2004: Saniye's Lust
2005: Istanbul Tales (Anlat İstanbul)
2005: Zeit der Wünsche, as Hamife
2008: 
2013:

References

External links

1971 births
Living people
Actresses from Berlin
German film actresses
German television actresses
German people of Turkish descent
Berlin University of the Arts alumni
20th-century German actresses
21st-century German actresses